Omoadiphas aurula is a species of snake in the family Dipsadidae.

It is found in the mountain range Sierra de Omoa of Cortés Department, Honduras.

References

Original publications
 Köhler, Wilson & Mccranie, 2001 : A new genus and species of colubrid snake from the Sierra de Omoa of northwestern Honduras (Reptilia, Squamata). Senckenbergiana biologica, .

Omoadiphas
Snakes of Central America
Endemic fauna of Honduras
Reptiles of Honduras
Reptiles described in 2001
Taxa named by Gunther Köhler